Own Kongding (born 27 November 1913, date of death unknown) was a Chinese weightlifter. He competed in the men's lightweight event at the 1936 Summer Olympics.

References

1913 births
Year of death missing
Chinese male weightlifters
Olympic weightlifters of China
Weightlifters at the 1936 Summer Olympics
Place of birth missing
20th-century Chinese people